Madhuca ochracea is a tree in the family Sapotaceae. The specific epithet ochracea means "yellowish brown", referring to the indumentum.

Description
The bark is greyish brown. Inflorescences bear up to seven flowers.

Distribution and habitat
Madhuca ochracea is endemic to Borneo, where it is known only from Sarawak. Its habitat is lowland mixed dipterocarp forest from sea level to  altitude.

Conservation
Madhuca ochracea has been assessed as vulnerable on the IUCN Red List. The species is threatened by logging and conversion of land for palm oil plantations. One collection (of two) of the species is in Niah National Park, where the habitat is considered intact.

References

ochracea
Endemic flora of Borneo
Trees of Borneo
Flora of Sarawak
Plants described in 2001